Mal Walden is a former English-born Australian retired journalist and television news presenter based in Melbourne. On his retirement, he was reported to be the longest continually serving face on Australian television with a media career spanning six decades.

Biography

Walden was the main presenter of the Seven Network Melbourne program Seven National News from 1978 to 1987 and the Ten Network program Ten Eyewitness News from 1987 until 2013.

Walden was farewelled at State Parliament hosted by Premier Denis Napthine and awarded a lifetime achievement quill by the Melbourne Press Club.

Since his retirement Walden has published five books: a memoir The Newsman, and Good News, a selection of stories that shaped the city of Melbourne, "Don't Piss in my Pocket" a book of quotes, 'Crazy Aussie Crims" and "Aussie Icons and Legends".

Career
Walden started his media career at radio station 3YB-FM at Warrnambool, Victoria, in 1961, he worked as a cadet journalist in radio. After joining radio station 3DB, Walden moved to television to sister station HSV-7 in early 1970 as a reporter. One of his first assignments was to go to Darwin to report on the devastation of Cyclone Tracy which ripped through the tropical city on 25 December 1974 (Christmas Day).

In 1978, he became the first working journalist appointed chief news presenter at Seven Network studio. HSV-7, replacing Brian Naylor who had moved to rival Nine Network station GTV-9.

On 27 March 1987, Walden was sacked by new management after HSV-7 was taken over by the Fairfax group. He was told of his dismissal only minutes before going on air to present what became his final news bulletin for the station.

Exactly a month later, Mal joined the Ten Network program. Eyewitness News team at ATV-10 as a reporter and presenter of the segment "Mal's Melbourne", presenting human interest stories.  Walden continued as relieving news presenter, reporter and weekend news presenter at ATV-10, as well as presenting special programming such as Young Australian of the Year and ATV-10's 30th Anniversary.

In 1996, Walden took on the role of chief news presenter after David Johnston announced his return to HSV-7.  He was appointed news presenter of the station's Ten News at Five alongside Jennifer Hansen and later Helen Kapalos.

In 2004, he published a detailed history of ATV-10 to commemorate the station's upcoming 40th anniversary. In September 2010, Walden was announced as presenter of Melbourne's 6:30 pm Ten Evening News bulletin which commenced in January 2011 but was axed four months later. After Helen Kapalos was dismissed in December 2012, Walden became solo presenter of Ten News at Five.

In 2006, Walden became the longest 'continually serving' face on Australian television, following 36 years presenting.

In June 2013, Walden downscaled his role with Network Ten ahead of his intended retirement at the end of 2013 after 40 years as a news presenter and reporter. Walden became the Monday to Wednesday presenter with Stephen Quartermain presenting the Thursday and Friday night editions.

On Wednesday 4 December 2013, he presented his last Ten Eyewitness News Melbourne bulletin thanking his family, past and present colleagues, station management and viewers.

Personal life
Walden and his wife Pauline Durham, who originally worked in the programming department at the Seven Network HSV-7 studio, have two adult children.

References

External links
"Mal Walden's 40 years read well", news.com.au; accessed 10 May 2015.

Television personalities from Melbourne
Journalists from Melbourne
Living people
Australian game show hosts
Seven News presenters
10 News First presenters
Australian broadcast news analysts
Australian reporters and correspondents
People educated at Mentone Grammar School
1943 births
English emigrants to Australia